Harriston (population 1,797) is a community in the Town of Minto in Wellington County, Ontario, Canada. In 1999, Harriston was amalgamated with the communities of Palmerston, Clifford, and Minto Township to form the Town of Minto. Harriston is located at the headwaters of the Maitland River, and has several shops, restaurants, a library, an art gallery and cultural centre.

History
In the summer of 1845, the first non-Aboriginal settlers arrived in the area. The Crown did not make land available for sale in the region until 1854.

The town was named after Archibald Harrison, a Toronto farmer who was granted land along the Maitland River in Minto Township, at the Elora and Saugeen Road in 1854. Harrison's brother George Harrison built the first sawmill in 1854, and in 1856 his brother Joshua Harrison built the first gristmill, and also had the first store in the village of Harriston.  The Harrisons had considerable wealth when they moved to the community from York County, and became leading men in the pioneer settlement. The population was only 150 but there were businesses including a blacksmith and wagon maker when a post office was established in 1856.

Archibald Harrison was the first postmaster; he also built the first hotel, and was also the first Reeve of Minto. He gave the land for Knox Church and cemetery, also land for the first school. The southern road leading to Harriston was gravelled in 1861, opening easier access to the larger markets of Guelph, Hamilton, and Toronto. The community became a prosperous commercial and farm-implement manufacturing centre following the construction of the Wellington, Grey and Bruce Railway, completed to Harriston in 1871. A telegraph link to the community followed soon thereafter. By 1872, when the village was incorporated, the population was 500. It became a Town in 1878. A second rail line (the Toronto, Grey and Bruce Railway) intersected the village in 1873. In 1882, the Grand Trunk Railway began shipping through Harriston.

In 1874, Harriston hosted a significant political rally, attended by approximately 1,000 people. Speakers included the provincial Premier, Oliver Mowat, and R.H. Taylor, secretary of the English National Agricultural Labourers Union.

A Carnegie Library opened in Harriston in 1908, designed by architect William Edward Binning.

Economic downturn and demographic changes caused significant hardship for the town during the 1970s. In September 1981, the Toronto Star featured a front page article entitled, "The Slow Death of a Town named Harriston." The article's author, Fran Macgregor, notes, "Harriston used to have three grocery stores. Now there are two." As of the early 2000s, there was only one grocery store. From the mid-2000s to 2014, the settlement did not have a gas station.

In 1995, the Progressive Conservative government of Ontario began to reduce the number of total municipalities in the province.  On January 1, 1999, the Town of Minto was created through the amalgamation of the towns of Harriston, Palmerston, the former village of Clifford, and the surrounding rural area of the former Minto Township.

Civil society

Beginning in the late 1860s, Harriston's citizens began to create friendly service organizations parallel to, as well as outside, of religious groups. In 1868, the Loyal Orange Institution (Orange Order) opened a Harriston Lodge (#1152). In 1871, the Ancient, Free & Accepted Masons (commonly known as Freemasons) established a Lodge (#262). Other groups followed, such as the Independent Order of Oddfellows (1879), as well as the Independent Order of Good Templars (active by 1874) and the Royal Templars of Temperance (active by 1900).  The Harriston Minto Agricultural Society was founded in 1859 and continues to operate an annual fall fair on the third weekend in September.

Sports
The Harriston Blues were a hockey team which played in the WOAA Senior AA Hockey League from 1969 to 1977, and then in the Ontario Hockey Association from 1976 to 1987.  The Mapleton-Minto 81's is a senior hockey team based out of Palmerston, Harriston, and Drayton.

The Harriston Curling Club competes across Ontario.

Education
Students from Harriston attend schools of the Upper Grand District School Board.  These include:
 Minto-Clifford Public School (grades K-8).
 Norwell District Secondary School.

Notable people
 James Cowan, member of the Legislative Assembly of Manitoba; practiced medicine in Harriston for 11 years.
 Shirley Eikhard, singer-songwriter who wrote "Something to Talk About"
 John G. FitzGerald, founder of the Connaught Laboratories and the U. of Toronto School of Hygiene in 1927, served as Dean of Medicine at U. of Toronto from 1932-1936.
 James Henry Gundy, co-founder of Wood Gundy.
 John Landeryou, member of the House of Commons of Canada.
 Andrew James Macauley, member of the Legislative Assembly of Saskatchewan.
 William Melville Martin (second Premier of Saskatchewan), member of Freemasonic Lodge #262 (Harriston), beginning in 1900
 George McLeod, member of the House of Commons of Canada.
 Claude C. Robinson, ice hockey and sports executive, inductee into the Hockey Hall of Fame, and the Canadian Olympic Hall of Fame

References

Communities in Wellington County, Ontario
Former towns in Ontario
Populated places disestablished in 1999